Ana Sofia Nóbrega (born 20 December 1990) is a Portuguese-Angolan swimmer. She competed in the women's 100 metre freestyle event at the 2016 Summer Olympics where she ranked 40th with a time of 59.23 seconds. She did not advance to the semifinals. She competed at the 2015 African Games.

References

External links
 

1990 births
Living people
People from Vila Real, Portugal
Angolan people of Portuguese descent
Portuguese female swimmers
Angolan female swimmers
Olympic swimmers of Angola
Swimmers at the 2016 Summer Olympics
Place of birth missing (living people)
Portuguese female freestyle swimmers
Angolan female freestyle swimmers
Swimmers at the 2015 African Games
African Games competitors for Angola
Sportspeople from Vila Real District